Maung Win Maung (born 1921) was a Burmese weightlifter. He competed in the men's bantamweight event at the 1948 Summer Olympics.

References

External links
 

1921 births
Possibly living people
Burmese male weightlifters
Olympic weightlifters of Myanmar
Weightlifters at the 1948 Summer Olympics
Place of birth missing